The Aparimitāyurnāma sūtra is a Mahayana sutra focusing on the buddha Aparimitāyus and his dhāraṇī, which the sutra recommends reciting to obtain long life.

It was particularly popular in Central Asia and Tibet. Thousands of copies were made in the late Tibetan Empire, the majority of which are now found in collections of Dunhuang manuscripts in the Bibliothèque nationale de France, the British Library, with smaller collections in Russia, China and Taiwan.

References

External links
 , a copy of the Tibetan translation of the Aparimitāyurnāma sūtra from the Mogao Caves at Dunhuang, now held at the British Library

Mahayana sutras